Downtown Wake Forest Historic District is a national historic district located at Wake Forest, Wake County, North Carolina. The district encompasses 25 contributing buildings, 1 contributing structure, and 1 contributing object built between about 1890 and 1949 and located in the central business district of the town of Wake Forest.  It includes notable examples of Colonial Revival and Art Deco style architecture. Notable buildings include the Lovelace Building (1940s), Dick Frye Restaurant (1940s), Powers-Barbee Building (c. 1890, 1940s), Wilkinson Building (1899), B&S Department Store (1894-1895, 1949), Arrington Building (1915), Bank of Wake (1895), Wake Forest Post Office (1914), Collegiate Theater (1915), and Wake Forest Post Office (1940).

The district was listed on the National Register of Historic Places in 2002.

References

Historic districts on the National Register of Historic Places in North Carolina
Art Deco architecture in North Carolina
Colonial Revival architecture in North Carolina
Geography of Wake County, North Carolina
National Register of Historic Places in Wake County, North Carolina